The Polish Sport Shooting Federation, is the Polish association for sport shooting under the International Practical Shooting Confederation (IPSC) and the International Shooting Sport Federation (ISSF).

References 

Regions of the International Practical Shooting Confederation
Sports organisations of Poland
National members of the European Shooting Confederation